"Rainbow" is a song written and performed by Russ Hamilton.  It reached #4 on the U.S. pop chart and #10 on the R&B chart in 1957.  The song was featured on his 1957 album, Rainbows.

The song was arranged by Johnny Gregory.

Other versions
Bobby Breen released a version of the song in 1957 as the B-side to his single, "We Will Make Love".
Jim Lowe released a version of the song as part of the Rainbow EP in 1957.
Clinton Ford released a version of the song as a single in 1963 in the UK.
The Fleetwoods released a version of the song as a single in 1965.
Jerry Wallace released a version of the song in 1965 in the UK as the B-side to his single, "Time".
Tommy Roe released a version of the song in 1962 as the B-side to his single, "Town Crier".
Terry Black released a version of the song as a single in 1966 that reached #17 in Canada.

References

1957 songs
1957 debut singles
1963 singles
1965 singles
1966 singles
The Fleetwoods songs
Tommy Roe songs
Terry Black songs